Kocktails with Khloé is an American pop culture–themed variety talk show that premiered on the FYI cable channel on January 20, 2016. The series is hosted by reality television personality Khloé Kardashian. In April 2016, FYI cancelled Kocktails with Khloé after one season.

Production 

The series was greenlit on July 21, 2015. The network ordered eight one-hour episodes; the production of Kocktails with Khloé commenced immediately after the announcement. The talk show is hosted by television personality and socialite Khloé Kardashian, who is well known for appearing on the reality television series Keeping Up with the Kardashians and its spin-offs. Apart from appearing on shows with her family, Kardashian has previously participated in several other media projects, including being a co-host on the second season of The X Factor with Mario Lopez in 2012, as well as featuring on DJ for Khloé After Dark on Miami's Y100 radio station in 2009. The talk show is produced by Craig Piligian and Derek W. Wan from Pilgrim Studios, and Gena McCarthy, Toby Faulkner and Lauren Wohl from the network as well as Khloé Kardashian herself. The series is filmed in Los Angeles, California. The show was broadcast on FYI, an American cable network, previously known as The Biography Channel, which features mostly lifestyle-themed programming.

"[The show] is something I’m extremely proud of and I’m excited to execute it with my amazing partners, Pilgrim and FYI," said Kardashian who also serves as the executive producer of the show, "I’m lucky that I’ve been able to invite fans into my life and home on a weekly basis and this show will give me an opportunity to continue to do that with new and exciting guests. [...] I can't wait to show my fans what we have in store on ‘Kocktails With Khloe.'" The show is produced by Pilgrim Studios which describes the upcoming series as "a hybrid talk show" set in a unique intimate format surrounded by celebrity guests and friends. Craig Piligian, an executive producer of the studios, felt positively about the upcoming project by saying:

The talk show premiered on January 20, 2016. In April, it was announced that the network cancelled Kocktails with Khloé  after one season. The final episode aired on April 20.

Episodes

Reception 
Maria Yagoda, announcing the show for the People magazine, felt very positive about the series and said that "the show’s basic premise (along with the fact that "kocktails" is in the title) is already getting us very excited".

Broadcast 
The talk show was initially scheduled to premiere on December 9, 2015 in the United States, but the date later was pushed to January 20, 2016. The eight-episode series is broadcast on the FYI cable network. The show will continue to air in the same time slot for eight consecutive weeks. In the United Kingdom, 4Music acquired the series and it premiered on April 26, 2016.

See also 

 Revenge Body with Khloé Kardashian

References

External links 
 
 
 

2010s American television talk shows
2016 American television series debuts
2016 American television series endings
American television spin-offs
English-language television shows
Television shows related to the Kardashian–Jenner family
FYI (American TV channel) original programming